Gomphidius nigricans is a mushroom in the family Gomphidiaceae that is found in eastern North America to as far west as Michigan.

References

External links

Boletales
Fungi described in 1897
Fungi of North America
Taxa named by Charles Horton Peck